The 2022 Ferrari Challenge Europe is the 30th season of Ferrari Challenge Europe and its predecessor Ferrari Challenge Italy. The season consists of 7 rounds, starting at the Autódromo Internacional do Algarve on 2 April 2022 and ending at the Autodromo Enzo e Dino Ferrari during the Ferrari World Finals on 30 October 2022

Calendar 
The season consists of 14 races run at seven different circuits in Europe.

Drivers' Standings

Trofeo Pirelli

References

External links
 Official website

Europe 2022
Ferrari Challenge Europe
Ferrari Challenge Europe